The Department of Health and Family Welfare of State of Tamil Nadu is a department of Government of Tamil Nadu responsible for ensuring access to basic public health services in Tamil Nadu. Its undertakings include National Health Mission – Tamil Nadu, Tamil Nadu Medical Services Corporation, Medicinal Plant Farms and Herbal Medicine Corporation and Transplant Authority of Tamil Nadu. It is headquartered in Chennai.

Sub - Departments

Undertakings & Bodies

Ministers for Health and Family Welfare

See also 
 Government of Tamil Nadu
 Tamil Nadu Government's Departments
 Ministry of Health and Family Welfare (India)
 Department of Finance (Kerala)

References

External links
   Official Website of the Tamil Nadu Health and Family Welfare Department - 1
   Official Website of the Tamil Nadu Health and Family Welfare Department - 2)
    RTI site of the Tamil Nadu Health and Family Welfare Department  
 Official website of Government of Tamil Nadu

Tamil Nadu state government departments
Health in Tamil Nadu
Tamil Nadu
Year of establishment missing
Tamil Nadu